A suicide note or death note is a message written by a person who intends to die by suicide.

A study examining Japanese suicide notes estimated that 25–30% of suicides are accompanied by a note. However, incidence rates may depend on ethnicity and cultural differences, and may reach rates as high as 50% in certain demographics. A suicide message can be in any form or medium, but the most common methods are by a written note, an audio message, or a video.

Reasons
Some fields of study, such as sociology, psychiatry and graphology, have investigated the reasons why people who complete or attempt suicide leave a note.

The most common reasons that people contemplating suicide choose to write a suicide note include one or more of the following:
To ease the pain of those known to the victim by attempting to dissipate guilt.
To increase the pain of survivors by attempting to create guilt.
To set out the reason(s) for suicide.
To send a message to the world.
To express thoughts and feelings that the person felt unable to express in life.
To give instructions for disposal of the remains.
Occasionally, to confess acts of murder or some other offence.

Sometimes there is also a message in the case of murder-suicide, explaining the reason(s) for the murder(s), see for example, Marc Lépine's suicide statement and videotaped statements of the 7 July 2005 London bombers.

See also

References

External links

A collection of suicide notes and letters
Famous suicide notes—dying words of famous people
The Presentation of the Self in Suicide Notes by David Lester & Bijou Yang

Letters (message)
Note
Death
Symptoms and signs of mental disorders